The 2015 Women's Australian Hockey League was the 23rd edition of the women's field hockey tournament. The tournament was held in the New South Wales city of Sydney.

The Queensland Scorchers won the gold medal for the fifth time by defeating the Victorian Vipers 2–1 in the final.

Competition format

The tournament is divided into two pools, Pool A and Pool B, consisting of four teams in a round robin format. Teams then progress into either Pool C, the medal round, or Pool D, the classification round. Teams carry over points from their previous match ups, and contest teams they are yet to play.

The top two teams in each of pools A and B then progress to Pool C. The top two teams in Pool C continue to contest the Final, while the bottom two teams of Pool C play in the Third and Fourth place match.

The remaining bottom placing teams make up Pool D. The top two teams in Pool D play in the Fifth and Sixth place match, while the bottom two teams of Pool C play in the Seventh and Eighth place match.

Teams

  Canberra Strikers
  New South Wales Arrows
  NT Pearls
  Queensland Scorchers
  SA Suns
  Tassie Van Demons
  Victorian Vipers
  WA Diamonds

Results

First round

Pool A

Pool B

Second round

Pool C (Medal round)

Pool D (Classification round)

Classification games

Seventh and eighth place

Fifth and sixth place

Third and fourth place

Final

Awards

Statistics

Final standings

Goalscorers
6 Goals
 Emily Hurtz
5 Goals

 Emily Smith
 Murphy Allendorf
 Jodie Kenny

4 Goals

 Grace Stewart
 Kathryn Slattery

3 Goals

 Anna Flanagan
 Laura Gray
 Savannah Fitzpatrick
 Karri McMahon
 Claire Messent
 Georgia Nanscawen
 Kim Lammers

2 Goals

 Kate Hanna
 Kate Jenner
 Mariah Williams
 Jill Dwyer
 Madison Fitzpatrick
 Madonna Blyth
 Anna Busiko
 Georgie Parker
 Ashleigh Nelson

1 Goal

 Catriona Bailey-Price
 Edwina Bone
 Shelley Watson
 Naomi Evans
 Lily Brazel
 Lisa Farrell
 Greta Hayes
 Georgina Morgan
 Cara Simpson
 Mikaela Patterson
 Amy Swann
 Tegan Richards
 Stephanie Kershaw
 Renee Taylor
 Gabrielle Nance
 Emily Grist
 Charlotte van Bodegom
 Leah Welstead
 Amelia Spence
 Elanor Brennan
 Madeleine Newlyn
 Madeleine Hinton
 Sarah McCambridge
 Sophie Taylor
 Kate Denning
 Jess Esslemont
 Erin Flynn
 Penny Squibb
 Georgia Wilson

References

2015
2015 in Australian women's field hockey